is a Japanese animator, designer, and animation director.

Honda dropped out of Tokyo Design Academy and joined the original Gainax team. At Gainax, Honda debuted in drawing supervision at age 22. His debut as character designer was on the series Metal Fighter Miku, and he continued animating, supervising and designing characters on several other noted series and video games. Honda has also done some prop design.

Works

Anime television series
Nadia: The Secret of Blue Water (1990–1991, animation director, key animation, ending animation (ep.39))
Fatal Fury 2: The New Battle (1993, key animation)
Metal Fighter Miku  (1994, character design, ending animation, assistant animation director (ep.13), key animation (ep.13))
Pretty Soldier Sailor Moon S (1994–1995, key animation (ep.14))
Neon Genesis Evangelion  (1995–1996, opening animation, animation director (ep.2, 8, 19, 22, 25), key animation (ep.1, 19, 25–26), 設定補 (ep.15))
Hell Teacher Nūbē  (1996–1997, animator, animation supervision)
Fighting Spirit (anime) (2000–2002, key animation (opening))
RahXephon (2002, key animation (ep.15))
Rozen Maiden (2004, key animation (opening))
Paranoia Agent (2004, key animation (ep.8, 13))
Windy Tales (2004, key animation (opening, ep.2))
Beck: Mongolian Chop Squad (2004–2005, key animation (opening, ep.7))
Gankutsuou: The Count of Monte Cristo (2004–2005, key animation (opening))
He Is My Master (2005, ending support)
Dennō Coil (2007, character design, chief animator)

OVA anime
Bubblegum Crisis (1987–1991, key animation (ep.8))
Gunbuster  (1988, key animation (ep.3–6), in between animation (ep.1–2))
Mobile Suit Gundam 0080: War in the Pocket (1989, key animation)
Doomed Megalopolis (1991, key animation (ep.1))
Mobile Suit Gundam 0083: Stardust Memory (1991, key animation)
Otaku no Video  (1991–1992, animation director, key animation (ep.1–2, opening ep.2))
Green Legend Ran (1992–1993, assistant animation director (ep.3), key animation)
Tenchi Muyo! Ryo-Ohki (1992–1993, key animation (ep.3))
Giant Robo  (1992–1998, key animation (ep.1))
Oh My Goddess! (OVA) (1993–1994, general animation director (ep.2), assistant animation director (ep.1, 4–5))
Oira Uchū no Tankōfu  (1994, key animation)
Macross Plus  (1994–1995, key animation (ep.1))
Elementaler (1995, key animation)
Golden Boy (1995–1996, animation director (ep.2))
Starship Girl Yamamoto Yohko (1996, key animation (ep.1))
Detatoko Princess (1997–1998, key animation (ep.2))
Blue Submarine No. 6  (1999, animation character design (ep.3–4), animation director (ep.3–4), key animation (ep.1, 4))

ONA anime
20min Walk From Nishi-Ogikubo Station, 2 Bedrooms, Living Room, Dining Room, Kitchen, 2mos Deposit, No Pets Allowed (2014, original story, director (with Mahiro Maeda))

Anime films
Roujin Z  (1991, key animation)
Ghost in the Shell (1995, prop design)
Memories: Magnetic Rose (1995, prop design)
The End of Evangelion  (1997, Eva series designer, mechanical animation director (ep.25), key animation (ep.25))
Perfect Blue  (1997, key animation)
Jin-Roh  (1999, key animation)
Millennium Actress  (2001, character design, animation director, key animation)
Beyond (2003, character design, animation director)
The Second Renaissance  (2003, key animation)
Ghost in the Shell 2: Innocence (2004, key animation)
Naruto the Movie: Snow Princess' Book of Ninja Arts (2004, key animation, animation director, scene director)
Portable Kūkō (2004, key animation)
Soratobu Toshi Keikaku (2005, key animation)
Tennis no Ōjisama - Futari no Samurai  (2005, key animation)
Tales from Earthsea (2006, key animation)
Evangelion: 1.0 You Are (Not) Alone (2007, key animation, mechanical animation director)
From up on Poppy Hill (2011, key animation)
A Letter to Momo (2011, key animation)

Games 
Dragon Quest III (1988)
Tales of Legendia (2005, key animation)
Tales of the Abyss (2005, in-betweens)

References and notes

External links 
 Hate na Diary
 Allcinema.net

Living people
Japanese animators
Japanese animated film directors
Artists from Ishikawa Prefecture
1968 births